George Cooper (1 October 1932 – 1994) was an English professional footballer who played as a forward in the Football League for Crystal Palace and Rochdale.

Career
Cooper was born in Kingswinford, then within Staffordshire but subsequently part of the West Midlands. He began his career with Brierley Hill Alliance, then playing in the Birmingham & District League. In January 1955, he signed for Crystal Palace of the Third Division South. He made a goal-scoring debut in an away 4–1 win at Walsall on 12 March. He went on to make eight appearances that season scoring twice. In the subsequent four seasons, Cooper made a further 62 league appearances (25 goals) before moving on to Rochdale in January 1959. He made a total of 75 appearances in all competitions for Palace scoring 28 times.

Personal life
Cooper died in 1994, aged 61–62.

References

External links
Cooper at holmesdale.net

1932 births
1994 deaths
English Football League players
Association football forwards
Brierley Hill Alliance F.C. players
Crystal Palace F.C. players
Rochdale A.F.C. players
People from Kingswinford
English footballers